The Eugenia oil field on the continental shelf of the Black Sea was discovered in 2010 and developed by Sterling Resources. It was scheduled to begin producing oil in 2015.

References

Black Sea energy
Oil fields in Romania